The House of Music (Haus der Musik) is a music museum operated by the Landesmuseum Württemberg. It is housed in the Fruchtkasten, located on the Schillerplatz in downtown Stuttgart.

External links

 Official website (in German)

Musical instrument museums in Germany
Buildings and structures in Stuttgart